Frontal sinus trephination is a surgical procedure where in a small opening is made in the floor of the frontal sinus facilitating drainage of its contents. Drainage of the frontal sinus is done through the floor of frontal sinus above the inner canthus.

History

According to San Diego Museum of Man at San Diego in California, a set of 70 trephined skulls were found in Peru, which were scraped, drilled or cut for medical or spiritual purposes. This procedure was used during prehistoric times.

Technique 
In case of refractory frontal sinus disease, the endoscopic access is not possible. A combination of external frontal sinus trephination and intranasal endoscopy is used to approach the frontal sinus. This will help to improve the access to frontal sinus. Frontal sinus trephination also enhances the visualization in anatomy. The incision is made in the medial aspect of eyebrow above, parallel to hair line. A 4–5 mm diameter hole is drilled into the anterior table of the sinus. The best location of the trephine is the floor of sinus or through brow ridge. If there is possibility of development of osteomyelitis, trephine should be made inferiorly. Precaution is taken not to injure the supraorbital nerve. The pus is cultured and irrigated, and the sinus is cleared with a saline or an antibiotic solution. Extra holes are cut in two pieces of french red Robinson rubber catheter or Silastic tubing. The two tubing pieces are inserted through trephine and sutured. An alternative method is the minitrephine system manufactured by Medtronic-Xomed, in which a metal cannula wedged firmly into an accurately shaped hole is used.

Indications
In case of acute sinusitis when not responding completely to medical management. During endoscopic sinus surgery, it can be used to identify the frontal sinus opening inside the nasal cavity. Endoscopically, it is detected by visualizing flushed fluorescein dye into the nasal cavity. This process is a reliable method to detect the frontal sinus outflow tract. Also while in some cases after endoscopic sinus surgery, frontal sinus trephining is indicated in order to prevent stenosis of frontal sinus infundibulum by passing down a catheter into frontal recess. Following endoscopic frontal sinus surgery, frontal sinus trephination can be used for instillation of medications like topical antibiotics and steroid irrigation.

Complications
The most common complication of frontal sinus trephination are cellulitis, brain injuries due to penetration of posterior table of frontal sinus and middle shift orbital complications may also occur.

Trephination of frontal sinus is a safe procedure though precautions should be taken. This procedure has its own place, even in endoscopic era. It provides quick relief to patients with acute frontal sinusitis. It is easy to perform.

References

Nose surgery